North East High School (NEHS) is a public high school in North East, Maryland on 300 Irishtown Road. It is a part of Cecil County Public Schools.

As of 2019, North East High School has 1,083 students enrolled.

The school colors are blue and white with red as a secondary color.

Their school mascot is an Indian.

References

External links

 North East High School

Public high schools in Maryland
Schools in Cecil County, Maryland